Mehmet Ali Tanman (born 1 January 1913) was a Turkish international association football player. He played his entire career at Beşiktaş.

Career

Tanman was recruited in Beşiktaş by former manager and club executive Ahmed Şerafettin. He became the regular goalkeeper of the club after Sadri Usuoğlu.

Honours
 Beşiktaş J.K.
 Istanbul Football League (6): 1933–34, 1938–39, 1939–40, 1942–43, 1944–45, 1945–46
 Turkish National Division (2): 1940, 1944
 Chancellor Cup (1): 1944

References
Citations

Bibliography

External links
 Tanman at Beşiktaş J.K.
 Tanman at Maçkolik

1913 births
Turkish footballers
Association football goalkeepers
Beşiktaş J.K. footballers
Year of death missing